Beheira Governorate ("the governorate of the Lake") is a coastal governorate in Egypt. Located in the northern part of the country in the Nile Delta, its capital is Damanhur.

Overview

Beheira Governorate enjoys an important strategical place, west of the Rosetta branch of the Nile. It comprises four important highways, namely the Cairo-Alexandria desert road, the Cairo agricultural road, the international road, and the circular road. Beheira Governorate is also home to a number of the most important Coptic monasteries in Wadi El Natrun (Scetes).

Beheira consists of 13 centers and 14 cities, and contains important industries such as cotton, chemicals, carpets, electricity, and fishing.

The governorate has a noteworthy number of archaeological sites, including at Abu El Matamir, Abu Hummus, Damanhour, Rosetta (Rashid), and Kafr El Dawwar. Coins, lamps, animal bones, and pottery from Roman and later Eastern Roman (Byzantine) eras are some of the archaeological finds discovered at Kom El Giza, and Kom El Hamam in Beheira.

In 2017, Egyptian President Abdel Fattah al-Sissi appointed the first female governor in the country's history, Nadia Ahmed Abdou, for Beheira Governorate.

The rate of poverty in the governate is more than 60%, however, some social safety networks have been provided recently in the form of financial assistance, and job opportunities. The funding has been coordinated by Egypt's Ministry of Finance and with assistance from international organisations.

Municipal divisions
The governorate is divided into the following municipal divisions for administrative purposes, with a total estimated population as of July 2017 of 6,200,137. In some instances there is a markaz and a kism with the same name.

Population
According to population estimates, in 2015 the majority of residents in the governorate lived in rural areas, with an urbanization rate of only 19.5%. Out of an estimated 5,804,262 people residing in the governorate, 4,674,346 people lived in rural areas as opposed to only 1,129,916 in urban areas.

Cities and towns
Abu Hummus
Abu El Matamir
Damanhur
Edku
El Delengat
 El Mahmoudiyah
El Rahmaniya
Itay El Barud
Hosh Issa
Kafr El Dawwar
Koum Hamada
Rosetta
Shubrakhit
Wadi El Natrun
El Nubaria

Notable people
 Karim Hafez, footballer
 Rehab Elgamal, Actress
 Ahmed Elgamal, Music Composer

Industrial zones
According to the Egyptian Governing Authority for Investment and Free Zones (GAFI), in affiliation with the Ministry of Investment (MOI), the following industrial zones are located in this governorate:
 Natron Valley 
 Boseili Desert 
 (New urban community industrial zone) Nubaria
 Edco

Projects and programs
In 1981, the Basic Village Service Program (BVS), under the auspices of USAID, had several water, road, and other projects, going on in several markazes in Beheira Governorate.

In 2018 the governorate council discussed a campaign of mosquito control and animal control to avert the spread of preventable diseases.

References

External links
 El Watan News of Beheira Governorate

 
Governorates of Egypt